Aqda Rural District is in Aqda District of Ardakan County, Yazd province, Iran. At the National Census of 2006, its population was 1,469 in 474 households. There were 3,798 inhabitants in 490 households at the following census of 2011. At the most recent census of 2016, the population of the rural district was 3,221 in 449 households. The largest of its 91 villages was Haftadar, with 404 people.

References 

Ardakan County

Rural Districts of Yazd Province

Populated places in Yazd Province

Populated places in Ardakan County